The Anegada Passage  is a strait in the Caribbean that separates the British Virgin Islands and the British ruled Sombrero Island of Anguilla, and connects the Caribbean and the Atlantic Ocean. It is 2300 m deep. Because the threshold depths are 1800 and 1600 m, Atlantic deep water from 1600 m level may flow into the deep areas in the Caribbean Sea.

The Anegada Passage is a key shipping lane for the Panama Canal. Often called the "Oh-my-god-a Passage", it is considered a difficult passage for sailors because of the winds, waves, and swells.

The Anegada Trough
The passage consists of multiple basins and ridges. The Anegada Trough or Virgin Islands Basin was the likely site of the 1867 Virgin Islands earthquake and subsequent tsunami.

See also 
Noroit Seamount

References

Straits of the Caribbean
Bodies of water of Anguilla
Bodies of water of the British Virgin Islands